Things You Shouldn't Say Past Midnight is a 2000 American play written by Peter Ackerman.

In 2014 DirecTV picked up 10 episodes of original comedy based on Things You Shouldn't Say Past Midnight to be adapted into a television series.

Plot
Set in modern Los Angeles, the story of a variety of relationships told through the concept that nothing good ever happens after midnight.

References

2000 plays
American plays
2014 American television series debuts